This is a list of football clubs in Scotland.

Clubs in membership of the Scottish Professional Football League

Scottish Premiership

Aberdeen
Celtic
Dundee United
Heart of Midlothian
Hibernian
Kilmarnock
Livingston
Motherwell
Rangers
Ross County
St Johnstone
St Mirren

Scottish Championship

Arbroath
Ayr United
Cove Rangers
Dundee
Greenock Morton
Hamilton Academical
Inverness Caledonian Thistle
Partick Thistle
Queen's Park
Raith Rovers

Scottish League One

Alloa Athletic
Airdrieonians
Clyde
Dunfermline Athletic
Edinburgh
Falkirk
Kelty Hearts
Montrose
Peterhead
Queen of the South

Scottish League Two

Albion Rovers
Annan Athletic
Bonnyrigg Rose Athletic
Dumbarton
East Fife
Elgin City
Forfar Athletic
Stenhousemuir
Stirling Albion
Stranraer

Clubs in membership of the Highland League

Banks O' Dee
Brechin City
Brora Rangers
Buckie Thistle
Clachnacuddin
Deveronvale
Formartine United
Forres Mechanics
Fraserburgh
Huntly
Inverurie Loco Works
Keith
Lossiemouth
Nairn County
Rothes
Strathspey Thistle
Turriff United
Wick Academy

Clubs in membership of the Lowland League

Berwick Rangers (located in England) 
Bo'ness United
Caledonian Braves
Celtic B
Civil Service Strollers
Cowdenbeath
Cumbernauld Colts
Dalbeattie Star
East Kilbride
East Stirlingshire
Edinburgh University
Gala Fairydean Rovers
Gretna 2008
Heart of Midlothian B
Open Goal Broomhill
Rangers B
The Spartans 
Tranent Juniors
University of Stirling

Clubs in membership of the East of Scotland League

Premier Division

First Division

Second Division

Third Division

Clubs in membership of the South of Scotland League

Abbey Vale
Caledonian Braves reserves
Creetown
Lochar Thistle 
Lochmaben
Mid-Annandale
Newton Stewart
Nithsdale Wanderers
St Cuthbert Wanderers
Stranraer reserves
Upper Annandale
Wigtown & Bladnoch

Clubs in membership of the West of Scotland League

Premier Division

First Division

Second Division

Third Division

Fourth Division

Clubs in membership of the North Caledonian League
 

 Alness United
 Bonar Bridge
 Clachnacuddin Reserves
 Fort William
 Golspie Sutherland
 Halkirk United
 Invergordon
 Inverness Athletic
 Loch Ness
 Nairn County Reserves
 Orkney
 St Duthus
 Thurso

Clubs in membership of the Scottish Junior Football Association

East Region

Midlands League

North Region

Premier

North Championship 
Aberdeen University
Banks O' Dee Juniors
Buchanhaven Hearts
Burghead Thistle
Cruden Bay
Deveronside
Forres Thistle
Fraserburgh United
Glentanar
Islavale
Longside
Lossiemouth United
New Elgin
Newmachar United
Rothie Rovers
Sunnybank

Miscellaneous clubs at amateur level
Colville Park (Central Scottish Amateur Football League)
Drumchapel Amateur (Caledonian Amateur Football League)
Dukla Pumpherston (charity and exhibition matches)
East Kilbride YM (Caledonian Amateur Football League)
Eyemouth United (Border Amateur Football League)
Glasgow Harp (Caledonian Amateur Football League)
Harestanes (Central Scottish Amateur Football League)
Links United (Caledonian Amateur Football League)
Oban Saints (Scottish Amateur Football League)
Rothesay Brandane (Caledonian Amateur Football League)
Steins Thistle (Central Scottish Amateur Football League)
Tain Thistle (Ross-shire Welfare Football League)

Defunct clubs

Former Scottish Football League members

Selected other senior clubs (including North Caledonian League)

Selected other junior clubs

University clubs
Most universities in Scotland have football sides, as do some colleges, some compete in the BUSA Football League.

Aberdeen University
Edinburgh University
Glasgow University
Heriot-Watt University
St Andrews University
University of Stirling

References

External links
 All-time Scottish Football Club Directory 1829-2009, Brian McColl, via Scottish Football Historical Archive (archived version, 2015)